The following are the national records in athletics in South Africa maintained by Athletics South Africa (ASA).

Outdoor

Key to tables:

+ = en route to a longer distance

A = affected by altitude

h = hand timing

OT = oversized track (> 200m in circumference)

a = aided road course according to IAAF rule 260.28

Men

Women

Mixed

Indoor

Men

Women

Notes

References
General
South African Outdoor Records - Senior  31 December 2018 updated
Specific

External links
 ASA web site

South Africa
Records
Athletics
Athletics